Vile is a 2011 American horror film directed by Taylor Sheridan and starring Eric Jay Beck, April Matson, Akeem Smith, Greg Cipes, Maya Hazen, Heidi Mueller, and McKenzie Westmore. It follows ten kidnapped captives who have 22 hours to mount an escape from a locked room, and must endure excruciating pain in order to win their freedom. It premiered at the Film4 FrightFest on August 26, 2011 before its wide release in the United States on June 24, 2012.

Plot

The film starts with a man on an operating table. A surgeon enters and tortures him by cutting into his chest and pouring salt in his wound. The scene shifts to four friends, Tayler, Tony, Kai, and Nick, on a camping trip. On their way home, they stop at a gas station where an alluring stranger named Diane asks for a ride to her truck, which has run out of gas. Nick agrees, but his girlfriend Tayler is suspicious. Nick drops her off at her truck, and Diane offers to get the girls some of her perfume samples in gratitude. Diane then returns wearing a gas mask, and knocks everyone out with sleeping gas. The friends awaken to find themselves trapped in a house with four other people, one of whom has already ripped off Kai's nail. After a brief fight, Nick and Tony calm down and learn they have all been captured and the doors are locked. Everyone has a gadget inserted into his or her neck and they watch a video from a projector of a woman telling them they have 22 hours to escape. In order to do so they must inflict harm on each other using the weapons they have been supplied with.

Suffering fills up a jar and once the jar is filled, they will be able to remove the gadgets and escape. If they fail, the gadget will inject poison into their brains and kill them. One man, Julian, breaks down and removes his gadget, dying instantly. The others decide they have no choice and begin with Greg, a reporter who may know about this plan and hopes to see his son again. The group beats him and breaks off his fingernails. One girl, Tara, is especially violent and breaks his leg on the table, causing him to pass out. Deciding they cannot risk injuring each other to this extent, the group agrees to torture each person up to no higher than six percent of the meter in a certain order. Sam is up first, and already has many mysterious wounds. After being burned on the stomach with an iron and having some fingernails ripped out, it is Nick's turn. In attempt to make things easier for him, Tayler sneaks Nick some oxy pills; however, this slows down the meter. While Nick is semi-conscious, the group contemplates leaving Greg behind, as they will need their strength to escape. Everyone agrees except for Tony, while Tayler agrees for both herself and Nick. Next on the list is Lisa, who tries to avoid being tortured by hiding, but is dragged out by Sam and Tara. Nick eventually regains his senses, and tells Tayler that he would never have opted for the group to leave Greg behind, and that he can't understand why Tayler would. Tayler apologizes for the pills, saying she only meant to help Nick, and reveals that she is pregnant. Tara overhears this and informs the group, insisting that Tayler go anyway; Nick volunteers to go in her place.

Tara tries to stop Nick from giving the remaining pills to Greg, but Tony, fed up, knocks her out and Nick gives Greg the rest of the medication. Later on, Tony, Tayler and Kai, try to get six percent each by sticking their hands in boiling water, but Kai backs down so Tony and Tayler stick their arms in the boiling water again. Meanwhile, Tara who has regained consciousness, takes a kitchen knife and tries to kill Tony for punching her. Tony is stabbed in the shoulder and falls to the floor as the boiling water spills onto his body. Tara attempts to stab him again, but is knocked out again by Nick. Tara regains consciousness on the torture table and immediately asks what percentage the meter is at. Tony tells her that her actions raised the meter to 48%. Tara, somewhat nervous, urges them to get her shift done quickly, but Tony reveals they will be pushing higher than the usual six percent this time. Tara starts to protest that they had voted on six percent and then cries, begging to be released. But the group took another vote while she was knocked out and decided on this instead. She desperately tries to hold them back and in the process, cuts Kai, fatally wounding her. Tony, distraught and enraged, tries to kill Tara but Nick convinces him to keep her alive. Tony agrees, but demands that he gets do what he wants to her, and the rest of the group agrees. Tony severely damages Tara's larynx with a wrench, removes some her skin with a grater and cuts her arms open with a knife. When Tara finally passes out, the meter is at 80%.

With little time left, the remaining five agree to simultaneously break their collarbones. Tony is chosen to break everyone's collarbones, but can't force himself to break Tayler's. Nick instead breaks Tony's, filling the meter to 100%. The projector flashes a new message of the woman congratulating them and instructing them to place the vials in their gadgets in the door allowing them to escape. Sam kills everyone as they leave the room, though Tony has just enough time to warn Nick before Sam stabs him in the stomach. Soon only Greg and Tayler are left in the room while Nick is unable to reenter. Greg, still under the influence of the oxy pills, admits to Tayler that he knew about this cult that feels everyone deserves pain and agony, but he never believed the rumors were true. Sam is revealed to be the one who orchestrated this scenario. Nick chases Sam into the room seen at the beginning where Sam, having removed his gadget, kills Greg with a signal sent from a computer, locking Tayler up again. Tayler tries to escape by inflicting burns on her back with a countertop grill, and hurting her already burned hand. She manages to get the meter back up to 100%. Sam, amused, admits that he was one who had suffered injuries in his life and yet survived, leading him to believe that everyone deserves pain to be innocent. Sam then activates the device containing the poison on the back of Nick and Tayler's necks. Despite the poison, Nick is able to kill Sam with a screwdriver and takes some of the meds left in the room that counteract the poison. He also uses another device to remove the one from his neck. Nick rushes back to the room, able to see Tayler through a monitor on the screen but unable to reach her as she dies. Though heartbroken, Nick uses bolt cutters to free himself from the building and escape.

Some time later, Nick is seen in a restaurant, his injuries healed, and through the window he spots Diane and goes to her. Nick slams her head against her car, knocking her out. Nick stuffs Diane in the back and puts on "Lethal Injection" on the radio and comments what Diane said earlier: "I love this song."

Cast
 April Matson as Tayler
 Akeem Smith as Tony
 Greg Cipes as Sam
 Eric Jay Beck as Nick
 Elisha Skorman as Kai
 Heidi Mueller as Lisa
 Maya Hazen as Tara
 McKenzie Westmore as Diane
 Ian Bohen as Julian
 Kieron Elliot as Thomas
 Mark Hengst as Chuck
 Maynard James Keenan as Special Agent Ford (not in the movie)

Production
Taylor Sheridan, who went on to write Sicario and Hell or High Water and write and direct Wind River, is credited as director on the film. However, he does not consider the film his directorial debut, stating in a 2017 Rotten Tomatoes interview:

References

External links
 
 

2011 films
2010s English-language films
2011 horror films
2011 independent films
American horror films
American independent films
Films about interracial romance
Films directed by Taylor Sheridan
2011 directorial debut films
2010s American films